Arianit Ferati (born 7 September 1997) is a professional footballer who plays as a attacking midfielder for Dutch club Fortuna Sittard. Born in Germany, he plays for the Kosovo national team.

Club career

Early career and VfB Stuttgart
Ferati initially played for TSV Großheppach and SC Weinstadt in his youth. In the summer of 2011, he transferred to the Stuttgarter Kickers' youth team and after two years transferred to the VfB Stuttgart's youth team.

2015–16 period
Ferati in the 2015–16 season was promoted directly to the first team of VfB Stuttgart. On 31 July 2015, he made his debut with second team in a 1–3 home defeat against Preußen Münster after being named in the starting line-up.

On 29 August 2015, Ferati was named as a first team substitute for the first time in a league match against Eintracht Frankfurt. His debut with first team came fourteen days later in a 2–1 away defeat against Hertha BSC after coming on as a substitute at 79th minute in place of Daniel Didavi.

Hamburger SV

Joining the team and loan to Fortuna Düsseldorf

On 1 July 2016, Ferati signed a four-year contract with Bundesliga club Hamburger SV and was loaned out for a season to the 2. Bundesliga club Fortuna Düsseldorf. On 29 August 2016, he was named as a Fortuna Düsseldorf substitute for the first time in a league match against 1. FC Kaiserslautern. His debut with Fortuna Düsseldorf came fourteen days later in a 1–1 home draw against Greuther Fürth after coming on as a substitute at 57th minute in place of Axel Bellinghausen.

Loan at Erzgebirge Aue
On 8 June 2017, Ferati joined 2. Bundesliga side Erzgebirge Aue, on a season-long loan. Two month later, he made his debut in a 0–2 home defeat against his former team Fortuna Düsseldorf after coming on as a substitute at 73rd minute in place of Calogero Rizzuto.

Return from loan and period in the second team
On 1 January 2018, Hamburger SV cancels Ferati's loan and returns him to the team, but due to competition in the first team he is sent to the second team. On 26 February 2018, he made his debut with second team against VfL Wolfsburg II after being named in the starting line-up and scored his side's first goal during a 2–2 away draw.

Waldhof Mannheim
On 9 July 2019, Ferati signed a two-year contract with 3. Liga club Waldhof Mannheim. Twelve days later, he was named as a Waldhof Mannheim substitute for the first time in a league match against Chemnitzer FC. His debut with Waldhof Mannheim came on 11 August in the 2019–20 DFB-Pokal first round against Eintracht Frankfurt after coming on as a substitute at 63rd minute in place of Gianluca Korte.

Fortuna Sittard
On 29 July 2021, Ferati signed a two-year contract with Eredivisie club Fortuna Sittard. Sixteen days later, he made his debut in a 2–1 home win against Twente after being named in the starting line-up.

International career
From 2013, until 2017, Ferati has been part of Germany at youth international level, respectively has been part of the U16, U17, U18, U19 and U20 teams and he with these teams played 28 matches and scored 8 goals. He also played in the 2014 UEFA European Under-17 Championship.

In addition to his birthplace Germany, he had the right to represent Kosovo internationally, an alternative which he used in November 2022, where he decided to represent Kosovo and accept their call-up for the friendly matches against Armenia and Faroe Islands. His debut with Kosovo came five days after call-up in a friendly match against Armenia after coming on as a substitute at 65th minute in place of Uran Bislimi.

Personal life
Ferati was born in Stuttgart, Germany to Kosovan parents. His younger brother Ali Ferati is a footballer who plays as a attacking midfielder for the German club SV Fellbach.

Career statistics

Club

References

External links

1997 births
Living people
Footballers from Stuttgart
Kosovan footballers
Kosovo international footballers
German footballers
Germany youth international footballers
German people of Kosovan descent
Association football midfielders
Regionalliga players
VfB Stuttgart II players
Hamburger SV II players
Bundesliga players
VfB Stuttgart players
Hamburger SV players
2. Bundesliga players
Fortuna Düsseldorf players
FC Erzgebirge Aue players
3. Liga players
SV Waldhof Mannheim players
Eredivisie players
Fortuna Sittard players
Kosovan expatriate footballers
Kosovan expatriate sportspeople in the Netherlands
German expatriate footballers
German expatriate sportspeople in the Netherlands